Najafgarh Assembly constituency is one of the 70 Delhi Legislative Assembly constituencies of the National Capital Territory in northern India.

Overview
Present geographical structure of Najafgarh constituency came into existence in 2008 as a part of the implementation of the recommendations of the Delimitation Commission of India constituted in 2002.
Najafgarh is part of West Delhi Lok Sabha constituency along with nine other Assembly segments, namely, Madipur, Rajouri Garden, Hari Nagar, Tilak Nagar, Janakpuri, Vikaspuri, Dwarka, Matiala and Uttam Nagar.

Members of Legislative Assembly
Key

Election results

2020

2015

2013

2008

2003

1998

1993

See also
 Najafgarh

References

Assembly constituencies of Delhi
Delhi Legislative Assembly